Karwar is a seaside city, taluka, and administrative headquarters of Uttara Kannada district lying at the mouth of the Kali river on the Kanara coast of Karnataka state, India.

Etymology  
Karwar, also known locally as "Kādwād", derived its name from the nearby village of "Kade-Wādā". In the local Konkani language, Kade means "last" and Wādā means "precinct". Hence, Kade-Wādā ("the last neighbourhood") referred to the southernmost Konkani-speaking village. During the Crown rule in India, the name "Karwar" was spelt as  "Carwar". The ancient name was "Baithkhol"—from an Arabic term Bait-e-kol— meaning the "bay of safety". This is in the Indian history for maritime trade wherein black peppercorns, cardamom, and muslin cloth were exported from this Kādwād port and after the war with Veer Henja Naik (1803), the port activities were shifted to Baithkhol. Thereafter, the port of Kādwād was isolated and Kurmagad Fort was activated by the Portuguese.

History 

Karwar township was built by the British in the year 1857 after the Mutiny. Kawar is popularly known as the "Kashmir of Maharashtra". Prior to 1857, Karwar did not exist as a town. Honnavara was the district headquarters of Canara district consisting up to Mangalore to Kodibag Karwar, uptill Kali river; and Karwar village (Kādwād) existed as hamlets like Habbuwada, Kajubag, Kodibag, Kone, Baad, Kathinkon, Sunkeri, Shirwad, and Binaga. After that the river bank towards the north was under the rule of Sadhashiv Nayak and Maratha Confederacy. After the mutiny of 1857, the British made division of Canara District into two parts as South Canara with headquarters at Mangalore attached to Madras Presidency and North Canara with headquarters at the newly built town Karwar, which was attached to Bombay Presidency. It is a planned city like Panaji, Mumbai, Dharwad, and Bengaluru. After the rule of Indian Government from 1947, Karwar is more or less neglected politically and kept without major developments.

Ancient History 

Portuguese traders knew Karwar as Cintacora, Chitrakul, Chittakula or Sindpur. In 1510, the Portuguese captured and burnt a fort at Karwar. They called it Fort Pir, Forte de Piro or Pito due to the presence of a Muslim Dargah (tomb of a Sufi saint, Shahkaramuddin).

In 1638 the English trading Courteen Association established a factory at Kadwad village, 6 km east of Karwar and traded with merchants from Arabia and Africa. The common commodities were muslin, black pepper, cardamom, cassier and coarse blue cotton cloth.
In 1649 the Courteen Association merged with the British East India Company, and Karwar became a company town.
The East India Company built fighting ships in the Karwar harbour. For example, the Britannia (1715) which had 18 guns was built to defend Bombay from attacks by Maratha Koli admiral Kanhoji Angre.

In the 1700s, Karwar was a part of the Maratha Empire. Having marched from Bednore in the south, visiting on his way the sacred temple at Gokarna, Shivaji seized Ankola and the next day came to Karwar (then known as Kadwad). Both the East India Company and Sher Shah, the sardar of Bijapur, were very much alarmed at this sudden development. They collected huge amount and offering it to Shivaji, praying that they may be spared. Satisfied at the recognition of his authority, Shivaji crossed the Kali River and conquered Sadashivgad on 21 February 1665.

In 1784, at the time of the Treaty of Mangalore between Tipu Sultan and the East India Company, Karwar and Sadashivgad were spelt Carwar and Sadasewgude respectively. After the defeat of the Marathas in the Third Anglo-Maratha War, Karwar was captured by the British.
Kot Siveshvar, another fortress, was built near Karwar (in Siveshvar village) by the Sultan of Bijapur to counterattacks from the north.

At the ruins of Fort Siveshvar are a Muslim graveyard and a tunnel at the eastern gate.
The Bengali poet and Nobel laureate Rabindranath Tagore, who visited Karwar in 1882, dedicated a chapter of his memoirs to this town. At 22 years, Tagore stayed with his second brother, Satyendranath Tagore, who was a district judge in Karwar.

From 1862 until the re-organization of the Indian states after Independence, Uttara Kannada district was a part of the Bombay Presidency. During this period, major public works carried out included improvement of roads, building of a wharf, wharf road and a sea wall at the Karwar port as well as the construction of a multi-floor storage building, staff housing, a post office, kutcheri (kutcherries or zamindar's offices) and a Christian burial ground.
At the same time, the local Konkani-speaking people had close connections with Mumbai and Goa. Many Marathi middle schools were established in Karwar and Joida taluks, despite the fact that all local populace mostly were Konkani native speakers.

During World War II Karwar was an Indian Naval training site.

Post-Independence 
Post-Independence Karwar was made a part of newly formed Mysore state following requests by the people of Karwar. Karwar during the 1950–60s played import role against the Konkani language agitation, helping cement Konkani as an independent language during Konkani conferences held in Karwar. The city played an important role in Konkan culture and Konkani culture hosting many Konkani conferences to promote the language. There have been demographic shifts since the state reorganizations act, and Karwar is no longer the stronghold for Konkani culture and has been overtaken by Panaji (or Panjim), Goa (after Goa achieved statehood) and by Mangalore
.The city is also neglected by the state government and devoid of development. Spots of attractions are usually underfunded, relatively little money is allowed for development and people have to constantly rely on the neighboring state of Goa to carry out their needs.

Geography 

Karwar is a seaport on the west coast of peninsular India. To the east are the Western Ghats. Karwar is situated on the banks of the Kali river which flows west to the Arabian sea from its headwaters at Bidi village in the Western Ghats.

Baitkhol port at Karwar is a natural harbour with land side hills and ocean side islands protecting it from cyclonic weather. The four fathom mark lies close to the shore.

Biodiversity 

Several small mangrove covered islands lie off the Kali river estuary including Anjediva Island and Devagadaguda Islands. The sub-tidal regions of the islands have a high biodiversity, although the waters off Karwar have recorded higher than normal faecal coliform counts.

Climate 
Karwar lies on a coastal strip known as the Monsoon Coast. The Arabian Sea is warm throughout the year.

Demographics 
The total population in Karwar is 1,57,739 as of 2014 by Indian Government. As of 2014, Karwar had an average literacy rate of 89%, higher than the national average of 74%: male literacy was 94%, and female literacy was 84.85%. In Karwar, 10% of the population were children under 6 years of age.

Language

Border issues

Karwar taluka is majorly Konkani by ethnicity. It was part of the Bombay Presidency during the British colonial rule, before the reorganization of states. The native Konkani speakers had close connections with Bombay which extended to matrimonial relations too. Many Marathi-medium schools were also established in Karwar and Joida talukas for no specific reason. Marathi films were often released in Karwar. The visit of Marathi drama troupes from Bombay and Poona was an annual feature. However, Konkani-speaking people were disenchanted when Marathis began to claim   Konkani as a dialect of Marathi. They disputed it and asserted that Konkani had independent status as a language. It was the native Konkani-speaking people led by late P. S. Kamat who argued before Mahajan Commission that Karwar was an integral part of Karnataka.

There have been recent assertions by both Maharashtra and Goa that Karwar should belong to their states.

Religion 

Most people in Karwar are Hindu. Christianity was introduced to Karwar by the Portuguese while ruling Goa in the 16th and 17th centuries and contemporary Karwari Catholics are descendants of those early Christians. Muslim seafaring traders migrated to Karwar from the Deccan (Bahamani) kingdoms. Karwar was called Baithkol meaning the "house of safety" or Bait-e-kol meaning "place of safety" in Arabic. Muslim villages in Karwar include: Shiveshvar, Chittakula, Sawar Pai, and Hotegali. Islamic tradition holds that two brothers, descendants of Ali, the son-in-law of Muhammad, settled in Shiveshvar and made the village a place of Islamic learning. In Shiveshvar, there are three shrines dedicated to Muslim saints: Gaiby Pir, Nizam Pir, and Shamshuddin pir-in Kot.

Some famous Historic Mutt & Temples 

Shri Samsthan Shri Kshetra Baad Math (Gurumath, Karwar)
Shree Mahadeva Temple
Shri Shejjeshwara Temple

Primary industry 

Karwar is an agricultural region. The common crops are rice, groundnuts, green vegetables, onions, watermelons, and flowers. Other primary industries include animal husbandry, sericulture, horticulture, beekeeping, gathering and lumbering and the growing of homeopathic medicinal plants.

The coastal location of Karwar lends to fishing and fisheries which are concentrated in Harikanth, Konkan Kharvis, Gabiths and Ambigas. The common types of fish are mackerel, sardines, hardheads and prawns. Fishing is done from land with nets or from boats such as pandy (motor launch) and dhoni (dug out canoes). There is also mechanised trawling. The brackish water of the Kali estuary is suitable for prawn farming.

Secondary industry 

Members of the Daivadnya Brahmin caste are engaged in jewellery design, manufacturing and goldsmithing. Leather works are common.
Since 1638 when William Counten opened a mill, Karwar town has been a producer of fine muslin. In the 1660s the factory was prosperous, exporting the finest muslins in Western India; the weaving country was inland to the east, at Hubli and other centres, where as many as 50,000 weavers were employed. Besides the great export of muslin, Karwar provided pepper, cardamoms, cassia, and coarse blue cotton cloth (dungan). I

In Binaga township, a chemical company Aditya Birla Chemicals (earlier owned by Ballarpur Industries Ltd / Solaris Chemtech), manufactures caustic soda lye and flakes, chlorine, hydrochloric acid, phosphoric acid, kestra pipes and bromine.

Tertiary industry 

INS Kadamba 

The Indian Navy operates a naval base at a bay near Binaga township. It is the navy's third largest base. The base was founded as part of Project Seabird. Casurina beach near Binaga (now called Kamat Bay) and Arga beach were incorporated into naval property. The public has access to the base during Navy Week in December and in visiting educational groups. The naval base includes a civilian support community at Amadalli, a ship lift and an hospital. INS Kadamba is the homeport of India's largest aircraft carrier INS Vikramaditya.

INS Vajrakosh 

INS Vajrakosh, commissioned on 9 September 2015, is the latest establishment of the Indian Navy at Karwar which will serve as special storage facility for specialised armaments and missiles. INS Vajrakosh will have all the required infrastructure and will be staffed by specialists to provide specialised servicing facilities for these sophisticated missiles and ammunition.

Aditya Birla Chemicals 

Aditya Birla Chemicals (India) (ABCIL) is a unit of the Aditya Birla Group.

ABCIL has also acquired chlor-alkali and phosphoric acid division of Ballarpur Industries Ltd / Solaris Chemtech Industries Limited, based in Karwar, Karnataka.

Transport

Karwar International Airport 
The proposed Karwar Airport will be built by the Indian Navy at Alageri village near Ankola, in Karnataka. The Airports Authority of India (AAI) will operate a civil enclave at the naval air base which is part of the Navy's Rs 100 billion Phase 2 of Project Seabird. After the construction Karwar will be the second city in Karantaka to have all 3 major modes of transport (Air, Sea, Land)

Konkan railway 

The Konkan Railway connects Karwar to most major towns and cities. Karwar has three railway stations: Karwar, Asnoti and Harwada. The nearest Goan station is Canacona, 36 km away.  lies 68 km to the north. and  253 km to the south.

Port 

Karwar port is located at Baithkol, Karwar Bay. Hills and coastal islands make the port a natural harbour, sheltered from the Arabian sea. The port which is operated by the Government of Karnataka, services the hinterland of northern Karnataka, Goa and southern Maharashtra.

Karwar port also berths coastal vessels and there is a jetty for fishing vessels. The Government of Karnataka has planned to develop Karwar port on a Public Private Partnership (PPP) basis to provide six additional berths, a container terminal, and a rail link to Karwar railway station.

The port is able to handle all types of commodities, including "B" and "C" class petroleum products. There port has liquid storage tanks for bitumen, furnace oil, molasses, and HSD. A ban of iron ore mining and export in Karnataka state reduced congestion at the port. The port has arrangements for berthing coastal vessels, and a jetty for fishing boats.

In 2012 the Government of Karnataka carried out maintenance dredging in the port, the approach channel and the nearby anchorage. The port may be closed from 16 May to 15 September (the monsoon season). Part of the 2008 Hindi film Golmaal Returns was filmed at Karwar port.

Tourism

Rabindranath Tagore beach 

"The sea beach of Karwar is certainly a fit place in which to realize that the beauty of Nature is not a mirage of the imagination, but reflects the joy of the Infinite and thus draws us to lose ourselves in it. Where the universe is expressing itself in the magic of its laws it may not be strange if we miss its infinitude; but where the heart gets into immediate touch with immensity in the beauty of the meanest of things, is any room left for argument?" – Rabindranath Tagore

Places of interest

Seaside 
 Kali River Garden, Kodibag
 Rock Garden, Karwar
 Binaga Beach
 Devbagh Beach
 Kali Bridge
 Karwar Beach
 Kurumgad Island
 Majali Beach
 Oyster Rock Lighthouse, a round white masonry construction with red trim protects ships from the rocks of Devgad Island, the largest off the Kali Estuary.
 Tilmatti beach, A black sand beach

Hinterland 
 Anshi National Park
 Kadra & Kodsalli dam
 Chaitanya Park
 Chendia and Nagarmadi falls (a small waterfall which passes under a large rock)
 Devkar Falls
 Guddahalli Peak
 Habbu Mountain
 Hyder Ghat Pass
 Mudgeri Dam
 Shirve Ghat
 Makkeri

Historic sites 
 Kot Shiveshvar
 Shri Narasimha temple, Siddar
 Sadashivgad Fort
 Shahkaramuddin dargah, Sadashivgad (tomb of a Sufi saint)
 Maritime museum

Culture

Cuisine 
Karwar is known for its seafood cuisine. Fish curry, with cashews, coconut and rice is a staple dish. Karwar curries use ginger and turmeric but not always garlic.

Local festivals 

 Kurumgad jatra
 São João where garlands of freshly picked fruits leaves and flowers are worn and people jump into wells, ponds, rivers, and lakes.
 Anjedweep island festival
 Karavali Utsav, an annual three of four-day festival at Rabindranath Tagore beach. It is organised by the Uttara Kannada District Administration as a cultural and social event. Many shops and stalls are installed at Tagore beach. People from all parts of the district and from all over the state and neighboring Goa state attend. Many cultural events are held in the evenings where regional, national and international artists including Bollywood stars, Kannada film stars, Goan artists and local artists perform.
Karwar utsav in summer season where local artistes and celebrities come and perform.

Media 
Media outlets include:
 Karwar eNews, online local newspaper.
 Karavali Munjavu, Kannada language daily newspaper.
 Zilla Varta Kendra media centre.
 District Library, near the district court and next to Mitra Samaj.
 All India Radio (Akashwani Kendra), Gurumath Road, Kajubag.

Education
Karwar has Government and private engineering college and Government medical college. The city has private and Government schools and institutions for PU, diploma and ITI courses.

Notable residents 
 Rama Raghoba Rane, (1918–1994). The only Param Vir Chakra Award winner from Karnataka.
 Jayshree Gadkar, a Marathi movie actress of the 1960s, born to a Konkani speaking family in Kanasgiri, near Sadashivgad.
 Bollywood singer Anuradha Paudwal, born in Karwar as Alka Nadakarni in a Konkani speaking family and brought up in Mumbai.
Gajanan Kirtikar, Member of parliament from Mumbai North West (Lok Sabha constituency)
Krishna Kalle, Playback singer in Marathi, Hindi, and Kannada films.

The above are few notable residents for KARWAR

Villages of Karwar 
Karwar comprises the following blocks or villages:
* Ambrai
 Amadalli
 Angadi
 Arga
 Asnoti
 Baad
 Baitkol
 Balni
 Bhaire
 Bhagatwada
 bargadda
 Bhandishitta
 Binaga
 Birtulbag
 Bore
 Chendia
 Chittakulla
 Devalmakki
 Devabag
 Dhol
 Gopashitta
 Goyar
 Gotegali
 Halebag
 Halekote
 Halga
 Hankon
 Hapkarni
 Harwada
 Hosali
 Hotegali
 Kadra
 Kadwad
 Kaiga
 Kajubag
 Kalaswada
 Kanasgiri
 Karkal
 Kathinkon
 Kerwadi
 Kharga
 Kinner
 Kodibag
 Kolage
 Kurnipet
 Lower Makeri
 Majali
 Maingini
 Mallapur
 Mudgeri
 Nandangadda
 Nargeri
 Sadashivgad
 Sakalbalni
 Sanmudageri
 Shejebag
 Shejwad
 Shirwad
 Siddar
 Sunkeri
 Thoralebag
 Todur
 Ulga
 Umlijug

See also 
 Sadashivgad
 Kali river
 Uttara Kannada
INS Kadamba

References

External links 

 Karwar City Municipal Council
 Zilla panchayat Karwar

 
Cities and towns in Uttara Kannada district
Port cities in India